Ed O'Donoghue (born 24 June 1982 in London, UK) is an Irish rugby union player.

Position
O'Donoghue's position of choice is as a lock and he can also operate as a flanker.

Early years
He was born in London to an Irish father and an Australian mother, he grew up in Brisbane, Australia

O'Donoghue attended Marist College Rosalie where he was selected to play for Australia at rugby union and volleyball, having to pass up the latter due to the requirements of the Australian Schoolboys Rugby Union team.

Rugby career
He earned a place on the Australia under 19s team to contest the Junior World Cup in Chile in 2001.

Searching for top flight rugby experience he played for Northampton Saints and Worcester Warriors in the Guinness Premiership. In 2006 O'Donoghue returned to Australia to take up a contract with his home state team Queensland Reds recruited by then coach Eddie Jones.

O'Donoghue played in the Australian Provincial Championship in 2006 and earned his first Super 14 start in 2007, going on to play all thirteen games in the season.

O'Donoghue joined Ulster Rugby at the start of the 2008/09 season after a two-year contract with Queensland Reds. He went on to represent the province 45 times in two seasons there"

He signed for Leinster Rugby in 2010 on a three-year contract. He was released early from his contract on compassionate grounds and signed for London Wasps on a short term contract.

He returned to Australia and took up an unpaid training position with the Queensland Reds for the 2013 season playing in every match in their run to the Super Rugby finals and in the process earning himself a full-time contract with the team.

International Rugby

Ireland
Irish-qualified through his parents he made his debut for Ireland Wolfhounds in February 2009 against Scotland A in the RDS in the 35–10 win.

He was selected for the 2010 Ireland rugby union tour of New Zealand/Australia.

He played two non-cap matches for Ireland against Barbarians and New Zealand Māori in June 2010.

References

External links
Ed O'Donoghue Reds College Player Profile
Ulster Rugby Profile
Ireland A Rugby Profile
Leinster Rugby Profile

1982 births
Irish rugby union players
Ulster Rugby players
Northampton Saints players
Worcester Warriors players
Irish Exiles rugby union players
Queensland Reds players
Leinster Rugby players
Wasps RFC players
SU Agen Lot-et-Garonne players
Rugby union locks
Irish expatriate rugby union players
Expatriate rugby union players in England
Expatriate rugby union players in Australia
Irish expatriate sportspeople in England
Irish expatriate sportspeople in Australia
Expatriate rugby union players in France
Irish expatriate sportspeople in France
Living people
English people of Irish descent